Mayo Peak is a flattish summit, about  high, which forms the south end of the Jones Bluffs, Bear Peninsula, on the Walgreen Coast of Marie Byrd Land, Antarctica. It was named by the Advisory Committee on Antarctic Names in 1977 after Elbert A. Mayo, Jr., of U.S. Navy Squadron VXE-6, a flight engineer on LC-130 aircraft, who participated in five Operation Deep Freeze deployments.

See also
Wright Pass

References

Mountains of Marie Byrd Land